Sorting nexin-2 is a protein that in humans is encoded by the SNX2 gene.

Function 

This gene encodes a member of the sorting nexin family. Members of this family contain a phox (PX) domain, which is a phosphoinositide binding domain, and are involved in intracellular trafficking. This protein associates with formin-binding protein 17, but its function is unknown. This protein may form oligomeric complexes with family members.

Interactions 

SNX2 has been shown to interact with FNBP1.

References

Further reading